Muhammad Nawaz (15 August 1924 – 13 May 2004) was a Pakistani javelin thrower who competed in the 1956 Summer Olympics and in the 1960 Summer Olympics.

He also won a bronze at the 1966 Commonwealth Games

References

1924 births
2004 deaths
Pakistani male javelin throwers
Olympic athletes of Pakistan
Athletes (track and field) at the 1956 Summer Olympics
Athletes (track and field) at the 1960 Summer Olympics
Asian Games gold medalists for Pakistan
Asian Games silver medalists for Pakistan
Asian Games medalists in athletics (track and field)
Athletes (track and field) at the 1954 Asian Games
Athletes (track and field) at the 1958 Asian Games
Athletes (track and field) at the 1962 Asian Games
Commonwealth Games silver medallists for Pakistan
Commonwealth Games bronze medallists for Pakistan
Commonwealth Games medallists in athletics
Athletes (track and field) at the 1954 British Empire and Commonwealth Games
Athletes (track and field) at the 1958 British Empire and Commonwealth Games
Athletes (track and field) at the 1962 British Empire and Commonwealth Games
Athletes (track and field) at the 1966 British Empire and Commonwealth Games
Medalists at the 1954 Asian Games
Medalists at the 1958 Asian Games
Medalists at the 1962 Asian Games
Medallists at the 1954 British Empire and Commonwealth Games
Medallists at the 1966 British Empire and Commonwealth Games